Baloch-Pashtun Unity Day is an international day celebrated by Balochis and Pashtuns to express unity and brotherhood to one-another. The day is celebrated yearly on August 31.

History

The day has been observed since . On August 31, 2015, it was celebrated mainly in Kabul, Afghanistan, where the Baloch leaders who want separation of Balochistan from Pakistan were invited too.

References

Observances in Afghanistan
Observances in Pakistan
International observances
Festivals in Afghanistan
Festivals in Pakistan
Pashtun culture
Baloch culture